Sekolah Menengah Kebangsaan Datuk Patinggi Haji Abdul Gapor (SMK DPHA Gapor) or in English: Datuk Patinggi Haji Abdul Gapor National Secondary School, is a public secondary school located in Kuching, Sarawak, Malaysia. The school was named after the Sarawakian hero Datu Patinggi Abdul Gapur.

History
SMK DPHA Gapor was established by Sarawak State Education Department in 1974.

The first principal of the school was Encik Haji Abdul Rahman bin Sahari. At that time, there were only 182 students studying in the school and a fraction of them were staying in the school's dormitories. There were only four teachers teaching in the school.

April 1974 marked an important date for the school because it was moved from SRK Lumba Kuda to new premises at Jalan Tun Jugah, Stampin. Due to the fact that SMK DPHA Gapor is now located in Stampin, it is also being referred to as SMK Stampin. It was the first-ever school in Sarawak to use Malay as primary language for communication.

In 1976, the first entry of students to SMK DPHA Gapor from the student exchange programme initiated by Sarawak Foundation boasted 20 male students from Peninsular Malaysia and 6 from Sabah.

In 1977, there were 26 classrooms, 8 of them for Transition classes, 10 for Form 1, 7 for Form 2 and 1 for Form 3.

The year 1986 was the most challenging year in the history of the school because in this particular year, for the first time, the school accepted admission of students into Lower 6 Literature classes, which consisted of 3 classes, and hearing-impaired students into Form 3 special class. Ergo, in 1987, the school issued its first Sijil Tinggi Persekolahan Malaysia (STPM) candidates and Sijil Rendah Pelajaran (SRP) hearing-impaired candidates. The Form 3 special class, together with the teachers, were transferred from SMK Batu Lintang because of the reasons that SMK DPHA Gapor was a boarding school and SMK Batu Lintang had established a special class for visually impaired students.

On 18 July 1987, SMK DPHA Gapor was officiated by the Minister of Finance, Yang Berhormat Mulia Tan Sri Tengku Razaleigh.

In the beginning, the school emblem had the letters "BM" written on it which were short for Berjaya Maju or Bahasa Malaysia, meaning succeed excellently  and Malay language respectively. Nevertheless, the official meaning of the two letters was towards the path of excellence. However, Encik Bedui bin Une, who was the eighth Principal in SMK DPHA Gapor, did a little amendment to the motto of the school and changed it to "Mudah, Logik, Praktikal", literally meaning simple, logical and practical. The school anthem Usaha dan Yakin was written by Encik Zainuddin Haji Suut.

List of Principals

School identity

School emblem
The school emblem was designed by Encik Haji Abdul Rahman bin Sahari in 1974.

Sports houses
Every year, Sports Day is held during the early part of the year. Students are divided into different houses (usually when they first enrolled into the school, without any specific classifications. Students are not allowed to switch between houses, unless there's imbalance amount of distributions.) and compete with each other to earn the title of "Best Sports House of The Year". Each house has different colours. These houses include
Barakuda (Blue)
Jerung (Yellow)
Lumba-Lumba (Purple)
Marlin (Red)
Paus (Green)

Prefectorial board
The board serves to make sure that the students of the school do not break any school rules. Prefects are divided into different units :
Disciplinary Unit
Assembly Unit
Cleanliness Unit
Safety and Surveillance Unit
Social and Welfare Unit

The councils include the Head Boy/Girl, Assistant Head Boy/Girl, Secretary, Treasurer, followed by the head of every unit.
 Both morning and afternoon sessions have different councils and at times have different ways of implementing the school rules. However, these prefects work together along with the School Monitors Association during big school events like Sports Day, Teacher's Day, school-level Independence Day Celebration and so on.

Achievements
 In 2010, SMK DPHA Gapor topped the secondary schools category with 16 gold and 2 silver medals in the 10th Sarawak Wushu Championship at Civic Centre.
 In 2011, the football team of SMK DPHA Gapor emerged as the champion of the 2nd Sarawak Football Development Programme (SFDP) Inter-Centre Southern Zone Football Tournament at SMK Tabuan Jaya field.
 In 2013, the school's handball team emerged victorious in the Kuching MSSM Handball Championship held at Stakan Sports Complex, Kota Sentosa.
 In March 2015, students from SMK DPHA Gapor swept the top three and consolation prizes in a web development competition organised by the Faculty of Engineering, Computing and Science at Swinburne University of Technology Sarawak Campus.
 In April 2015, Mohd Zuhayr Redza Noor Azrul, Melvin Gilbert Gimang and Marlon Umak of SMK DPHA Gapor 1 collected a total of 1,692 pinfalls and won the secondary schools category of the Megalanes Adventure World (MAW) Inter School Invitational Bowling Meet Saturday.
 In Malaysian University English Test (MUET) November 2016 session, Phoebe Ong Yunliang of SMK DPHA Gapor emerged as the country's top scorer.
 In 2017, the school continued to produce another top scorer, Wayne Ho Xiun Liang, in MUET November session.
 In July 2018, the team representing SMK DPHA Gapor, Lion and Unicorn, was among the gold prize winners of Young Innovators Challenge (YIC) Sarawak hosted by Swinburne University of Technology Sarawak Campus.
 In August 2018, SMK DPHA Gapor won second place for its 'Smart Container Reminder' project in the upper secondary category of the Robot Cup Competition at the Sarawak Community Invention Engineering Competition and Exhibition (SCIENCE) organised by Sarawak Energy.

References

Secondary schools in Malaysia
Educational institutions established in 1974
1974 establishments in Malaysia
Publicly funded schools in Malaysia